Richard Vincent Kadison (July 25, 1925 – August 22, 2018) was an American mathematician known for his contributions to the study of operator algebras.

Work
Born in New York City in 1925, Kadison was a Gustave C. Kuemmerle Professor in the Department of Mathematics of the University of Pennsylvania.

Kadison was a member of the U.S. National Academy of Sciences (elected in 1996), and a foreign member of the Royal Danish Academy of Sciences and Letters and of the Norwegian Academy of Science and Letters. He was a 1969 Guggenheim Fellow.

Kadison was awarded the 1999 Leroy P. Steele Prize for Lifetime Achievement by the American Mathematical Society. In 2012 he became a fellow of the American Mathematical Society.

Personal
Kadison was a skilled gymnast with a specialty in rings, making the 1952 US Olympic Team but later withdrawing due to an injury. He married Karen M. Holm on June 5, 1956, and they had one son, Lars.

Kadison died after a short illness on August 22, 2018.

Selected publications

Books
with John Ringrose: Fundamentals of the theory of operator algebras. 2 vols., Academic Press 1983; new edition, Fundamentals of the theory of operator algebras: Elementary theory, Vol. 1, 1997 Fundamentals of the theory of operator algebras: Advanced theory, Vol. 2, 1997 AMS 1997
with John Ringrose: Fundamentals of the theory of operator algebras, III-IV. An exercise approach, Birkhäuser, Basel, III: 1991, xiv+273 pp., ; IV: 1992, xiv+586 pp.,

PNAS articles

with I. M. Singer: 
with Bent Fuglede: 
with Zhe Liu: 

with Bent Fuglede:

References

External links

1925 births
2018 deaths
20th-century American mathematicians
21st-century American mathematicians
Members of the United States National Academy of Sciences
University of Chicago alumni
University of Pennsylvania faculty
Members of the Norwegian Academy of Science and Letters
Fellows of the American Mathematical Society
The Bronx High School of Science alumni
People from New York City